'''Sainik School Nagrota
(Jammu) is one of the 33 Sainik Schools of India.  It is a residential school.  The medium of instruction is English.  Established by Government of India on 22 August 1970 at Nagrota and is under Ministry of Defence. It is affiliated to Central Board of Secondary Education and is a member of Indian Public Schools Conference (IPSC).

The school prepares boys for entry into the National Defence Academy, Khadakwasla, Pune and for other walks of life.

Administration

Campus

Admissions

N.C.C.
Cadets join NCC through Navy and Army wing.

Cadets attend various camps like Basic leadership camp, Republic day camp, ATC, CATC, PRE-RDC, EBSB etc at various places near and far the campus during their academic tenure of 7  years at SSN.

There is a CAMPING GROUND OF NCC located 50 steps far the campus main gate.

Alumni

References

External links 
 Official website
 Sainik Schools Society

Sainik schools
Schools in Jammu and Kashmir
Jammu district
Educational institutions established in 1970
1970 establishments in Jammu and Kashmir